PAOK Academy is the football academy system of Greek professional football club PAOK consisting of eleven official youth teams (Under-6/7, Under-8, Under-9, Under-10, Under-11, Under-12, Under-13, Under-14, Under-15, Under-17 and Under-20), based on the young athletes' age.  PAOK's U15, U17 and U20 teams all play in Greek Superleague's  (Superleague U15, U17 and U20 respectively). Ιn 2016–17 season, U20 team participated in UEFA Youth League as a champion on official superleague U17 2015–16.
This academy holds more than 280 young players, and also more than 50 people work there (coaches, trainers, doctors etc.). The PAOK Academy maintains 16 training centers outside of Thessaloniki. These are in Athens, Didimoticho, Alexandroupoli, Komotini - Xanthi, Kilkis, Kavala, Drama, Kozani, Katerini, Lamia, Corfu, Rethymnon, Chios, Chalkidiki, Cyclades and Rhodes.

History

The first youth academy was created in 1952. The visionary was Austrian coach Wilhelm (Willi) Sefzik.
His dream was to be able to bring out new talents that could evolve from an early age into the PAOK team.
In 2007–2009, The former president Theodoros Zagorakis began the rebirth of the academies. Vangelis Pourliotopoulos undertook the reorganization,
and for the first time in PAOK history started an organized effort of the club to exploit, to bring out new talents, and promote young footballers systematically from the infrastructure departments of PAOK's to the first team. In 2009, the cost reached €1 million per year.
At that time the "Football Prints" program was created. Today more than 90 academies participate in this program.
In 2008, the first hostels in the Toumba Stadium were inaugurated. In the first three years, the hostels accommodated 14 children, who came from outside Thessaloniki

The evolution of academies continues to date, with Ivan Savvidis investing in a new home that will host young footballers.
In September 2015, the PAOK Academy acquired a seven-storey building in the center of Thessaloniki, where 55 young football players live there.
The cost of academies has now reached €2 million per year, making it the most expensive academy in Greece. According to the International Center for Sports Studies (CIES), the club has the best academies in Greece.

Organization

PAOK invest in setting up its own football schools to bring out talented children. To this day the club maintains 13 training centers in every corner of the country. PAOK FC youth sections, with the assistance of their network of collaborating academies (football prints), select the most talented players of each region, in order to have them train often and gradually follow the schedules and  aims of the PAOK academy players.

The objective of the club is encounter  young talented athletes aged no more than 12, and hand them at least 7 years of proper the footballing education, so that they can dive into the mentality and philosophy of their club. The scouting team visits each training centre once each month, in order to supervise the children's progress. Some distinguished children are invited to Thessaloniki to join the PAOK Academy, which will be staying at PAOK's house.

Since 2013, PAOK maintains a cooperation with Juventus on the academies sector.

Football Prints

PAOK football prints, is a network of academies working with the PAOK academy. Football Prints network functions through a communication system that is based on the eagerness of local academies to work and push talented children. The coordination of all academies has the Vangelis Pourliotopoulos and Kyriakos Alexandridis. In 2014, PAOK FC also organized their first "PAOK Football Prints Network Tournament". Since 2009, the club hold the annual youth tournament “Panagiotis Katsouris” in his memory, a renowned tournament and among the best in the Balkans.

List of academies

The 90 academies of "Football Prints" in Greece, according to geographic criteria.

Greece
Alexandroupoli: Pontiakos Alexandroupolis,
Argos: PAOK Koutsopodiou.
Arta: Dias Kostakion Arta.
Aspropyrgos: Pyrichios PAOK FC Aspropyrgou.
Athens: Athens Cosmos Club, Mikrasiatikos Kaisarianis. 
Chalkida: PAOK Kanithou Chalkidas.
Chalkidiki: Elpides Marmara, PAOK Stavrou.
Chania: Arena fc PAOK, Calcetto FC Chania.
Corfu: Olympiada Karousadon.
Didymoteicho: PAOK Iasmos, PAOK Isaakiou.
Drama: PAOK Megas Alexandros, Prosotsani, Fillipos Dramas.
Florina: Pas Florina.
Heraklion: Lido Soccer, Atsalenios academy.
Imathia: Meliki Academy
Ioannina: PAS Asteras Ioaninon.
Karpenisi: PAOK Karpenisiou.
Kastoria: Kronos Kastorias.
Katerini: Katerini academy 2006.
Kavala: Orfeas Eleftheroupolis, Mundialito, PAOK Kavalas, Aetos Orfanou.
Kilkis: Alexandros Kilkis, PAOK Kristonis.
Komotini: Fair Play, PAOK Komitini.
Konitsa: PAOK Konitsa, Pindos Konitsa.
Kos: PAOK Kos.
Kozani: Koilon academy, Siatista academy.
Lefkada: Tilikratis Lefkada, Panlefkadios.
Lemnos: Filoktitis Kontia.
Lesbos: Apollon Vounarakiou.
Orestiada: Oinoi Orestiadas.
Patra: Keravnos Agiou Vasiliou.
Paxoi: Paxoi academy.
Pella: Athletic Academy Skydras, PAOK Patriarxio, Apollon Kruas Vrisis.
Pieria: Giotsa academy, Makrygialos, Play Zone 2006.
Preveza: Real Team Preveza, RIA Sport academy.
Ptolemaida: Hercules Ptolemaidas.
Rethymno: Astera Rethymnou.
Rhodes: Euklhs Soronis., Asteras Pastida.
Skiathos: AO Skiathos academy.
Serres: Niki Christou, Ethnikos Sidirokastrou, Alistrati.
Thasos: Theagenis Thasos.
Thesprotia: Elpides Acheronta, Doxa Gardikiou.
Thessaloniki: Proteas, Achilleas Pereas, Elpides Sikeon, Bebides Ionias, Kypseli Neapolis, Liti academy, Academy MAS Atromitos Triadiou, GS Ilioupoli, Lykoi, AE falirou, PAOK Kymina-Malgara, Malakopi Pylaias, Aetoi fc, Doxa Drymou, Ioannis Papafis academy, Magnisiakos, M. Alexandros Kaloxoriou, Champions Pefkon, Keravnos Agiou Pavlou, Ethnikos Sohou, Diaplasi Oreokastro, Achilleas Triandrias, Doxa Elpidas Evosmou, Toumba FC.
Veria: Doxa Makroxoriou.
Xanthi: Elpides PAOK Xanthi.
Cyprus  
Larnaca: Nuovo Calcio .
Pano Polemidia: Karmiotissa Anorthosi Polemidion.
Paphos: Olympico academy.
Germany  
Krefeld: Hellas Krefeld.
Troisdorf: Hellas Troisdorf.
Munich: PAOK FC Pontos.
Offenbach: PAOK Offenbach.
Essen: Thessaloniki Essen
Wiesbaden: Hellas Wiesbaden.
Israel
Nazareth: PAOK Millya Academy. 
Sweden
 Stockholm: Akropolis IF.
Australia
 Adelaide: Adelaide Olympic FC.

Academy Personnel 

Source: PAOK F.C.

Players

U19 Squad

U17 Squad

U15 Squad

Honours 
Titles won and honours by the PAOK academy's teams.

Official youth championship's - International tournaments 

PAOK U20

 Greek Superleague U19
Winners (7): 2002–03, 2006–07, 2013–14, 2017–18, 2018–19, 2019–20, 2020–21
Runners-up (3): 2011–12, 2015–16, 2021-22
 Broersen International Youth Tournament
 Culemborg Cup
Winners (1): 2019
Runners-up (1): 2013

PAOK U17

 Greek Superleague U17
Winners (5): 2012–13, 2015–16, 2019–20, 2020-21, 2021–22
Runners-up (2): 2014–15, 2018–19

PAOK U15

 Greek Superleague U15
Winners (4): 2014–15, 2016–17, 2018–19, 2020–21, 
Runners-up (2): 2013–14, 2015–16, 2021-22
 International Viktor Ponedelnik's Cup
Winners (1): 2015
 Rimini Cup
Winners (2): 2014, 2002
 «We Love Football» tournament
 Runners-up (1): 2016

Domestic - International tournaments 

PAOK U14

 "International Children’s Football Festival": 2016

PAOK U13

 "Lennart Johansson Academy Trophy": 2013, 2017
 Runners-up: 2015
 "Panagiotis Katsouris" Football tournament: 2014, 2015
 "CVV Zwervers":
 Runners-up: 2014
 "Lukoil Cup": 2014, 2017 
 "Rodos Knights Cup": 2015
 "Pfingst Cup": 
 Runners-up: 2017

PAOK U12

 "Marc Overmars" : 2016

PAOK U11

 "Lokoball": 2013, 2014
 Runners-up: 2015, 2016
 "Panagiotis Katsouris" Football tournament: 2014
 «SANDANSKI CUP»: 2014
 "Invitational Cup Stockholm": 2015
 "Catnic Cup": 2016
 "«Paris World Cup»": 2016
 "Max Sport Youth Cup": 2015

PAOK U10

 "International tournaments Serbia": 2014  
 "IV International Football Tournament «Mini Football Magic»": 2015
 "International Orthopaedikos U10 Juniors Cup 2016":
 Runners-up: 2016

PAOK U9

 "Pfingst Cup": 2014
 "International tournaments Krnjevo": 2014 
 "Dragan Mance Cup 2017": 2017

PAOK U8

 "Olympico Paphos Tournament": 2017
 "Germany Offenbach Tournament": 2017<ref><ref>

Records

Top Scorers (All competitions)

Appearances (All competitions)

Notable players

Notable players coming from the club's youth departments include:

References

PAOK FC
Football academies in Greece
UEFA Youth League teams